Looker is a surname. Notable people with the surname include:

Charlie Looker, (born 1980), multi-project New-York based musician
Dane Looker (born 1976), American football player
David Looker (1913–1995), British bobsledder
Herbert Looker (1871–1951), English politician
Othniel Looker (1757–1845), American politician